AT-rich interactive domain-containing protein 1A is a protein that in humans is encoded by the ARID1A gene.

Function 

ARID1A is a member of the SWI/SNF family, whose members have helicase and ATPase activities and are thought to regulate transcription of certain genes by altering the chromatin structure around those genes. The encoded protein is part of the large ATP-dependent chromatin remodelling complex SWI/SNF, which is required for transcriptional activation of genes normally repressed by chromatin. It possesses at least two conserved domains that could be important for its function. First, it has an ARID domain, which is a DNA-binding domain that can specifically bind an AT-rich DNA sequence known to be recognized by a SWI/SNF complex at the beta-globin locus. Second, the C-terminus of the protein can stimulate glucocorticoid receptor-dependent transcriptional activation. It is thought that the protein encoded by this gene confers specificity to the SWI/SNF complex and may recruit the complex to its targets through either protein-DNA or protein-protein interactions. Two transcript variants encoding different isoforms have been found for this gene.

Clinical significance
This gene has been commonly found mutated in gastric cancers, ovarian clear cell carcinoma, and pancreatic cancer.
In breast cancer distant metastases acquire inactivation mutations in ARID1A not seen in the primary tumor, and reduced ARID1A expression confers resistance to different drugs such as trastuzumab and mTOR inhibitors. These findings provide a rationale for why tumors accumulate ARID1A mutations.

Research
Lack of this gene/protein seems to protect rats from some types of liver damage.

Interactions 

ARID1A has been shown to interact with SMARCB1 and SMARCA4.

References

Further reading

External links 
 
 
 

Transcription factors